The 60th Venice Biennale is an international contemporary art exhibition to be held from April through November 2024. The Venice Biennale takes place every two years in Venice, Italy, and participating nations select artists to show at their pavilions, hosted in the Venice Giardini, Arsenale, and palazzos throughout the city.

National pavilions

References 

National pavilions
Venice Biennale exhibitions